Warhammer Historical Wargames, also known as Warhammer Historical, was the publisher of Warhammer Ancient Battles and other game systems. It was an imprint from the BL Publishing division of Games Workshop.  From a leaked email from Rob Broom, who was the director of Warhammer Historical, it appears that Warhammer Historical is now a property of Forge World and his position has become redundant. In November 2010, it was reported that Games Workshop had dissolved the Warhammer Historical corporate structure.

On 25 May 2012, Games Workshop closed Warhammer Historical as a publishing and distribution arm of the company. These games are no longer available to purchase new, and presumably, production of any new systems has also ceased.

Game Systems
 Warhammer Ancient Battles
 English Civil War
 Warmaster Ancients
 Legends of the Old West
 Legends of the High Seas
 Richthofen's Flying Circus
 The Great War
 Trafalgar
 Waterloo

References

External links
Warhammer Historical Wargames
The Great War

Games Workshop
Mass media companies of the United Kingdom